Camp Hydle also called Drakes Bay Range was a large training center during World War II, located at Drakes Bay,  on what is now Point Reyes National Seashore on the coast of northern California in the United States. The camp had several training sites: Camp Hydle, Drakes Bay Air to Ground Gunnery Range, Drakes Bay Dive Bombing Target, Camp Murphy's Ranch, Camp Hydle Maneuver Area, and Camp Hydle Skip and Dive Bombing Range. Also at the camp were landing craft training and air sea rescue training. The site was 10,532 acres of Marin County, California land on the West Coast of the United States. The complete area from Stinson Beach to the south and Dillon Beach to the north was called the Point Reyes Gunnery Range at Point Reyes. The Gunnery Range also included: two radar towers, horse stable, two lifeboat Stations, the Point Reyes Lighthouse, lookout towers, and land strafing targets (rake). The dive bomber airplanes came from Hamilton Army Airfield (AAF), Santa Rosa Army Airfield (AAF), and Naval Air Station Alameda (NAS). In addition to Drakes Bay the planes also training using the nearby Abbotts Lagoon, and Tomales Bay. The landing craft training used Limantour Beach and Limantour Spit. Anti-aircraft gun training was important training for the Pacific War. Camp Hydle base was inland 1/2 mile east of Limantour Beach. For gunner training planes towed targets across Drakes Bay. The Navy's Camp Hydle took over the Point Reyes Lifeboat Station during the war. The 50 men at the Station were air sea rescue pilots, dropping rafts to plane crew that landed in the ocean during training. The first troops arrived at the site on December 7, 1941. The site was also used as a coast defense spot, looking out for Japanese subs and ships. Most of the land was leased from Leland Murphy (Murphy  Ranch), after the war in 1962, the site became Point Reyes National Seashore.

See also
 California during World War II
List of beaches in California
List of California state parks

References

Camp Hydle
American Theater of World War II
Closed training facilities of the United States Army
Installations of the United States Army in California
Formerly Used Defense Sites in California
California in World War II
1941 establishments in California